Miki Haimovich (  ; born 15 June 1962) is an Israeli television presenter, former politician and veganism activist. She served as a member of the Knesset for Blue and White from 2019 to 2021.

Biography
Michal (Miki) Haimovich earned a BA in political science from Tel Aviv University. Haimovich is vegan and in 2012 she launched the Meatless Monday Israel initiative.

Media career
Haimovich worked as a researcher for Channel 1 programmes Mabat Sheni and Boker Tov Israel. In 1990, she began editing the news for the Matav cable channel, later becoming chief editor.

In 1993, she and Ya'akov Eilon became the first news anchors on the new commercial Channel 2, until moving to Channel 10 together, in 2002.

In June 2011, Haimovich resigned from Channel 10 news.

Political career
In 2012, Haimovich joined a non-partisan campaign enlisting leading artists, television presenters and journalists to encourage voter participation in the 2013 Knesset elections.

She was elected to the Knesset in the April 2019 Israeli legislative election as a member of the Israel Resilience Party, a part of the Blue and White alliance. Haimovich was re elected to the 22 & 23rd Knessets. She was not included in Blue & White's electoral list for the 2021 elections, following her vote against a budget extension, which effectively caused the dissolution of the government.

See also
Channel 10 (Israel)
Hadashot 10
Women in Israel

References

External links

Meatless Monday Israel

1962 births
Living people
Blue and White (political alliance) politicians
Israeli people of Romanian-Jewish descent
Israeli people of Turkish-Jewish descent
Israeli television news anchors
Israeli television personalities
Israeli television presenters
Israeli veganism activists
Jewish Israeli politicians
Members of the 21st Knesset (2019)
Members of the 22nd Knesset (2019–2020)
Members of the 23rd Knesset (2020–2021)
Tel Aviv University alumni
Women members of the Knesset